Drumlion is a townland in north Roscommon in the parish of Killukin and the barony of Boyle. It is within the former Gaelic territory of Magh Luirg, also known as Síol Muireadhaigh. The surrounding countryside is dotted with many historical monuments such as ring forts (ráthanna) and fairy forts (liosanna). Drumlins are a prominent feature of the terrain along with many small streams feeding into the River Shannon.

The name of the townland is associated with the Táin Bó Cúailnge. As Queen Medbh assembled her forces for her invasion of Ulster a group of men coming to join her army from the province of Leinster camped on the highest ridge in the townland. It was from this action that Drumlion received its Irish name, as Droim Laighean translates into the "Ridge of the men of Leinster".

Drumlion has an area of 940,127 m2 / 94.01 hectares / 0.9401 km2 0.36 square miles, 232.31 acres / 232 acres, 1 rood, 9 perches. Located in the townland is St. Michael's Church and Drumlion Graveyard. The area is sparsely populated.

See also

 Boyle, County Roscommon
 County Roscommon
 Townland

References

Townlands of County Roscommon